The St Monica Choir was a Maltese polyphonic choir founded in 1964 by Sr Beniamina Portelli. The choir was often praised as one of the leading polyphonic choirs in Malta. The choir's music repertoire deviated from sacred to popular, early to contemporary. It dissolved in 2018, with most of its choristers remaining in the St. Monica Vocal Ensemble.

History
The choir was founded in 1964 by Sr Beniamina Portelli. For over 20 years, it collaborated with other entities, exchanging visits with foreign choirs and travelling to European countries. The choir presented concerts at the Liverpool Philharmonic Theatre, the Vatican City, St. Stephen's Cathedral in Vienna, Esztergom Cathedral in Hungary and St Mary's Cathedral in Edinburgh, as well as televised and radio recordings for renowned media stations such as the BBC and the ARD. Its collaboration with foreign choirs included the Knox Academy Choir from Scotland and the Beethoven Society of Australia. With the latter, the St Monica Choir presented a production of Beethoven's 9th Symphony with Orkestra Nazzjonali under the baton of Dr Steve Watson at the Teatru Manoel in May 1999. The St Monica Choir was also commissioned to premiere local compositions, such as Stabat Mater by prolific Maltese composer Carmelo Pace together with Orkestra Nazzjonali (the national orchestra) and Mro Michael Laus. Early 2007 saw yet another collaboration come to fruition, this time together with Vocalise, when, for the first time in Malta, Johann Sebastian Bach's Christmas Oratorio Parts I, II & III were performed at St John's Co-Cathedral under the direction of international conductor and musicologist Hans Jürgen Nagel.

In November 1999, the St Monica Choir became the first Maltese choir to win the Malta International Choir Festival. Delegated to represent Malta during the first edition of the choral Olympics held in Linz, Austria in 2000, the choir was awarded bronze from amongst over twenty participants in the mixed choirs’ category.

In 2002, the choir was invited to make a guest appearance during a choral festival at the Dorog House of Culture in Hungary. Two years later, the choir was once again invited to participate in the “XIII Festival de Musica en Navidad” organized by the Cultural Department of Madrid. The St Monica Choir, the only foreign choir invited to participate, held its concert at the Sagrada Familia church in Madrid.

In 2004, to commemorate the 40th Anniversary of its foundation, the choir launched a comprehensive website and a documentary on DVD encompassing forty years of existence and achievements. The choir's own productions of its Easter and Christmas concerts helped raise funds for various religious missions. In 2006, the St Monica Choir performed a concert in Haddington, Scotland to help raise funds for the local church there.

The choir was an affiliated member of Förderverein Interkultur, organizers of the Choir Olympics and other Musica Mundi concerts worldwide.

The Augustinian sisters were unable to continue with their commitments towards the Choir in late 2018, and the choir was disbanded. A myriad of the choristers now form part of the St. Monica Vocal Ensemble.

Founder and Director
Hailing from the city of Vittoriosa, Sr Beniamina Portelli, baptized Marion, is the eldest of 5 daughters and a son born to Carmelo and Ines née Calleja. The Portelli family took refuge in Siggiewi during the Second World War.

Portelli started her religious life with the Augustinian nuns at the age of sixteen. She took up piano lessons at the age of five, pursued her studies with Sr Teresina Saliba and conducted her finals and LRSM under the guidance of Ms Bascetta.

Portelli attended various courses both in Malta and abroad. Of note were here trips to the Vatican City in connection with choral singing (1953); Derbyshire regarding professional music teaching (1964); Harrogate for choral direction (1983); the London Royal Schools of Music with Mr A Kelly (1985); Edinburgh and London with EPTA (1993) and an LLCM for choral direction for which she was awarded the Society of Music Medal, having been the first successful candidate worldwide.

In the early 1950s, Portelli spent a year teaching music in Rome. On her return to Malta, she took up music teaching and broadened her students’ horizons by encouraging their involvement in a wider musical spectrum. She organized end-of-year concerts to encourage students to experience different dimensions of music, such as dancing and choral singing. She also the set up an accordion band.

In September 2000, the Mosta Local Council conferred upon Portelli “Gieh il-Mosta”, and in November 2000, she was awarded the Society Music Medal by the Council of Arts, Manufacture and Commerce. On 13 December 2003 at the Grandmaster's Palace in Valletta, the then President of the Republic Guido de Marco, awarded Portelli the Midalja għall-Qadi tar-Repubblika in appreciation of her efforts to promote music and the establishment of the St Monica Choir.

Portelli has had a number of students, such as composer Ray Agius, virtuoso pianists Mark Darnford and Stefan Cassar who also teaches music in France, John Attard who teaches music in Austria and Fr Aurelio Mule’ Stagno who obtained a distinction in all his examinations and is presently studying abroad. Others include Claire Massa, Simone Attard and Maureen Galea who graduated from the University of Malta.

Administration
The administrative committee was elected by the choristers for a two-year term and chaired by Portelli.

Voice-leaders sub-committee were headed by a coordinator acting in close liaison with the committee. Leaders from each voice-section were selected by Portelli in consultation with the coordinator and the committee president.

Awards and achievements

The 11th Malta International Choir Festival
St Monica Choir participated in the 11th Malta International Choir Festival in November 1999. The final night was held on 12 November 1999 at the Mediterranean Conference Centre. Other participating choirs included the Lakatamia Municipal Choir from Cyprus, the Děčínský pěvecký sbor from the Czech Republic and the St. Stythians Male Voice Choir, Cornwall, UK.
 
The choice of the repertoire included Magnus Dominus by Benigno Zerafa and the test piece, Quam Dilecta Tabernacula Tua Domine by Carlo Diacono (1876–1942). The choir's performance  also included Rhythm of Life from Sweet Charity, The Bare Necessities from the motion picture The Jungle Book and negro spirituals Hush, somebody’s Calling My Name and I Want Jesus. 
The adjudicating panel awarded St Monica Choir the first prize and gold trophy, the first time ever that a Maltese choir had won the Malta International Choir Festival.

2000 Choir Olympics
In Linz, Austria, the choir attended the official opening ceremony of the 1st Edition of the Choir Olympics at the multifunctional Design Center. 
During the Friendship Concert and the qualifying competition the choristers had the opportunity to meet choristers from Austria, Greece and Japan. The choir went on to win the bronze award in the mixed choir category.

Recordings
In September 2001, the choir released its first recording, titled Expressions. It was released in CD format for local distribution.

References

External links
Official website
Interkultur Foundation

Maltese choirs
Musical groups established in 1964
Maltese culture
Mosta